Silverblatt is a surname. Notable people with the surname include:

Howard Silverblatt (1909–1986), American actor, director, and musical performer
Irene Silverblatt, American cultural anthropologist
Michael Silverblatt (born 1952), American broadcaster